Wes George (born September 26, 1958) is a Canadian former professional ice hockey player. He was selected by the Detroit Red Wings in the 8th round (112th overall) of the 1978 NHL Amateur Draft, but had already signed a contract with the Edmonton Oilers of the World Hockey Association prior to the NHL draft.

George played two seasons of professional hockey, mostly (73 games) in the minor-pro IHL, AHL and EHL. During his first (1978–79) professional season, George played 12 games in the World Hockey Associationthree with the Edmonton Oilers and nine with the Indianapolis Racers.

References

External links

Living people
1958 births
Binghamton Dusters players
Canadian ice hockey left wingers
Detroit Red Wings draft picks
Edmonton Oilers (WHA) players
Flint Generals players
Indianapolis Racers players
Johnstown Red Wings players
Saskatoon Blades players
Ice hockey people from Saskatchewan